The 2009 edition of R League was held from March 30 to October 22. In this season, Jeju United didn't participated due to lack of players. Championship playoff's semifinals will be played 8 October 2009. Final's first leg matches will be played on 15 October, while the second leg matches will be played on 22 October 2009.

League standing

Group A

Group B

Group C

Championship playoff

Semifinals

Final

First leg

Second leg

External links
 K League website

R League seasons
2009 in South Korean football